GAY.tv, having debuted in 2002, was the only Italian television channel with programming aimed at LGBT, or lesbian, gay, bisexual, and transgender, audiences. On 18 December 2008, due to low revenue, it shut down operations and focused all activity on the website. On 13 September GAY.tv launched a new website which returned some of the original material from the TV show.

External links
 

Defunct television channels in Italy
LGBT-related television channels
Television networks in Italy
LGBT-related mass media in Italy
Television channels and stations established in 2002
2002 establishments in Italy
2008 disestablishments in Italy